François-Noël Babeuf (23 November 1760 – 27 May 1797), also known as Gracchus Babeuf, was a French proto-communist, revolutionary, and journalist of the French Revolutionary period. His newspaper Le tribun du peuple (The Tribune of the People) was best known for its advocacy for the poor and calling for a popular revolt against the Directory, the government of France. He was a leading advocate for democracy and the abolition of private property. He angered the authorities who were clamping down hard on their radical enemies. In spite of the efforts of his Jacobin friends to save him, Babeuf was executed for his role in the Conspiracy of the Equals.

The nickname "Gracchus" likened him to the Gracchi brothers, who served as tribunes of the people in ancient Rome. Although the terms anarchist and communist did not exist in Babeuf's lifetime, they have both been used by later scholars to describe his ideas. Communism was first used in English by Goodwyn Barmby in a conversation with those he described as the "disciples of Babeuf". He has been called "The First Revolutionary Communist."

About his political philosophy, Babeuf wrote: "Society must be made to operate in such a way that it eradicates once and for all the desire of a man to become richer, or wiser, or more powerful than others." In the Manifesto of the Equals, Babeuf wrote: "The French Revolution was nothing but a precursor of another revolution, one that will be bigger, more solemn, and which will be the last."

Early life 
Babeuf was born at St. Nicaise near the town of Saint-Quentin. His father, Claude Babeuf, had deserted the French Royal Army in 1738 for that of Maria Theresa of Austria, reportedly rising to the rank of major. Amnestied in 1755, he returned to France, but soon sank into poverty, and had to work as a casual labourer to support his  family. The hardships endured by Babeuf during his early years contributed to the development of his political opinions. Accused of abandoning the feudal aristocracy, he would later say that "the sun of the French Revolution" had brought him to view his "mother, the feudal system" as a "hydra with a hundred heads."

Revolutionary activities 
Babeuf was working for a land surveyor at Roye when the Revolution began. His father had died in 1780, and he now had to provide for his wife and two children, as well as for his mother, brothers and sisters.

He was a prolific writer, and the signs of his future socialism are contained in a letter of 21 March 1787, one of a series mainly on literature and addressed to the secretary of the Academy of Arras. From July to October 1789, he lived in Paris, superintending the publication of his first work:  ("National Cadastre or land register, Dedicated to the National Assembly, Year 1789 and the First One of French Liberty"), which was written in 1789 and issued in 1790. The same year he published a pamphlet against feudal aids and the gabelle (salt tax), for which he was denounced and arrested, but provisionally released.

Political writings and imprisonment 
Babeuf used his journal to agitate for a progressive taxation system, and condemned the "census suffrage" planned for the 1791 elections to the Legislative Assembly in which citizen votes would be weighted by their social standing. Due to his political activities, he was arrested on 19 May 1790, but released in July before the Fête de la Fédération, thanks to pressure exerted nationally by Jean-Paul Marat. In November Babeuf was elected a member of the municipality of Roye, but was expelled.

A rivalry with the principal administrator and later deputy to the Convention, André Dumont, forced Babeuf to transfer to the post of administrator of the district of Montdidier. There he was accused of fraud for having altered a name in a deed of transfer of national lands. The error was probably due to negligence; but, distrusting the impartiality of the judges of the Somme, he fled to Paris, and on 23 August 1793 was sentenced in contumaciam to twenty years' imprisonment. Meanwhile, he had been appointed secretary to the relief committee of the Paris Commune.

The judges of Amiens pursued him with a warrant for his arrest, which took place in Brumaire of the year II (1793). The Court of Cassation quashed the sentence, through defect of form, and sent Babeuf for a new trial before the Aisne tribunal, which acquitted him on 18 July 1794, only days before the Thermidorian Reaction.

The execution of Maximilien Robespierre on 28 July 1794 had ended the Reign of Terror and begun the White Terror. Babeuf – now self-styled Gracchus Babeuf – defended the fallen Terror politicians with the stated goal of achieving equality "in fact" and not only "by proclamation". However about the Terror, he said "I object to this particular aspect of their system." Babeuf attacked the leaders of the Thermidorian Reaction and, from a socialistic point of view, the economic outcome of the Revolution. He also argued for the inclusion of women into the political clubs.

This was an attitude which had few supporters, even in the Jacobin Club, and in October Babeuf was arrested and imprisoned at Arras. Babeuf emerged from prison a confirmed advocate of revolution and convinced that his project, fully proclaimed to the world in Issue 33 of his , could come about only through the restoration of the Constitution of 1793. That constitution had been ratified by a national referendum by universal male suffrage but never implemented.

Conspiracy of the Equals 

The attempts of the Directory to deal with the economic crisis gave Babeuf his historical importance. The new government wanted to abolish the system which benefitted Paris at the expense of all France. To this goal, the government planned to abolish the sale of bread and meat at nominal prices, on 20 February 1796. The announcement caused widespread consternation. The government yielded to the outcry, and tried to mitigate the problem by dividing people entitled to relief into classes, but this only increased alarm and discontent.

The universal misery gave point to Babeuf's virulent attacks on the existing order and gained him a hearing. In November 1795, police reported that Babeuf was openly preaching "insurrection, revolt and the Constitution of 1793".

For a time, the government left Babeuf alone but observed his activities. The Directory benefitted from the leftist agitation because it counteracted royalist movements for overthrowing the Directory. Most workers, even of extreme views, were repelled by Babeuf's bloodthirstiness; and police reported that his agitation increased support for the government. The Jacobin Club refused to admit Babeuf and Lebois, on the ground that they were "throat-cutters".

However, the economic crisis increased Babeuf's influence. After Napoleon Bonaparte closed the club of the Panthéon on 27 February 1796, Babeuf increased his activity. In Ventôse and Germinal (late winter and early spring) under the pseudonym , Babeuf published the paper "Scout of the People, or Defender of Twenty-Five Million Oppressed", which was passed from group to group secretly in the streets of Paris.

At the same time, Issue 40 of Babeuf's  caused immense sensation as it praised the authors of the September Massacres as "deserving well of their country" and declared that a more complete "2 September" was needed to destroy the government, which consisted of "starvers, bloodsuckers, tyrants, hangmen, rogues and mountebanks".

Distress among all classes continued. A rumour that national bankruptcy had been declared caused thousands of the lower class of workers to rally to Babeuf's ideas. On 4 April 1796, the government received a report that 500,000 Parisians needed relief. From 11 April, Paris was placarded with posters headed "Analysis of Babeuf's Teaching" , Tribun du Peuple, which began with the sentence "Nature has given to every man the right to the enjoyment of an equal share in all property", and ended with a call to restore the Constitution of 1793.

Arrest and execution 
Reports circulated that the disaffected troops of the French Revolutionary Army in the camp of Grenelle were ready to join an insurrection against the government. The  had accumulated through its agents (notably ex-captain Georges Grisel, who was initiated into Babeuf’s society) evidence of a conspiracy (later called the "Conspiracy of Equals") for an armed uprising fixed for 22 Floréal, year IV (11 May 1796), which involved Jacobins and leftists.

The Directory thought it time to react. On 10 May Babeuf, who had taken the pseudonym Tissot, was arrested. Many of his associates were gathered by the police on order from Lazare Carnot: among them were Augustin Alexandre Darthé and Philippe Buonarroti, the ex-members of the National Convention, Robert Lindet, Jean-Pierre-André Amar, Marc-Guillaume Alexis Vadier and Jean-Baptiste Drouet, famous as the postmaster of Sainte-Menehould who had arrested Louis XVI during the latter's Flight to Varennes, and now a member of the Directory's Council of Five Hundred.

The government crackdown was extremely successful. The last issue of the  appeared on 24 April, although René-François Lebois in the  tried to incite the soldiers to revolt, and for a while there were rumours of a military uprising.

Babeuf and his accomplices were to be tried at the newly created high court at Vendôme. When the prisoners were removed from Paris on 10 and 11 Fructidor (27 August and 28 August 1796), there were tentative efforts at a riot hoping to rescue the prisoners, but these were easily suppressed. On 7 September 1796, 500 or 600 Jacobins tried to rouse the soldiers at Grenelle but also failed.

The trial was held at Vendôme beginning on 20 February 1797. Although more important people were involved in the conspiracy, the government depicted Babeuf as the leader. His own vanity played into their hands. On 7 Prairial (26 May 1797) Babeuf and Darthé were condemned to death; some of the prisoners, including Buonarroti, were deported; the rest, including Vadier and his fellow-conventionals, were acquitted. Drouet managed to escape, according to Paul Barras, with the connivance of the Directory. Babeuf and Darthé were guillotined the next day at Vendôme, 8 Prairial (27 May 1797), without appeal.

Babeuf's body was transported and buried in a mass grave in the Vendôme's old cemetery of the Grand Faubourg, in Loir-et-Cher.

See also 
 Neo-Babouvism
 Pierre-Antoine Antonelle
 Society of the Friends of Truth

Notes

References 
 
 Ernest Belfort Bax, Last Episodes of the French Revolution, Haskell House Pub Ltd (1911; reprinted 1971), 
 Birchall, Ian H. The Spectre of Babeuf, Palgrave Macmillan (1997), hardcover, 204 pages,  or 
 Philippe Buonarroti, translated by James Bronterre O'Brien, Babeuf's Conspiracy for Equality, Hetherington (1836; first English edition); Kelly (1965) hardcover, 454 pages (original text on books.google.com)
 * Furet, Francois, and Mona Ozouf, eds. A Critical Dictionary of the French Revolution (1989) pp 179–85
 Rose, R. B. Gracchus Babeuf: The First Revolutionary Communist, Stanford University Press (1978), hardcover,  or Routledge (1978), hardcover, 
 Soule, George. Ideas of the Great Economists, New York: Viking press. 1953.

 Attribution

External links 

 
 Gracchus Babeuf and the Conspiracy of the Equals, documents on Marxists.org.
 Gracchus Babeuf and the Conspiracy of the Equals by Belfort Bax.
 Ian H. Birchall, Morris, Bax and Babeuf, review of Bax's book.

1760 births
1797 deaths
People from Saint-Quentin, Aisne
Proto-socialists
18th-century French journalists
18th-century French newspaper publishers (people)
Newspaper publishers (people) of the French Revolution
 
French people executed by guillotine during the French Revolution
French archivists